Rachel Aaron is an American author of fantasy and (under the pen name Rachel Bach) science fiction.

Work 
The first book in the Paradox Series, Fortune's Pawn (2013), is a type of space opera which was called "lots of fun" by Kirkus Reviews. Fortune's Pawn also marked Aaron's first time publishing science fiction. Publishers Weekly, however, felt that the tropes of the first book in the series were cliché and made up of "stock set pieces." Aaron's Paradox Series, including Honor's Knight (2014) deals with ethical questions amid "great space battles, awesome shootouts and enough betrayals and alliances to rival 'A Game of Thrones,'" according to The Washington Post. Kirkus also called Heaven's Queen (2014) a "stunning conclusion" to the Paradox Series. Publishers Weekly wrote that Heaven's Queen was a "satisfying conclusion."

Aaron's fantasy work on the Eli Monpress series revolves around a "legendary and lovable con man." The first book in the series, The Spirit Thief (2010) starts slow, according to the Publishers Weekly, but becomes a "romp of lighthearted fantasy."

Awards

On May 11, 2016, Rachel Aaron won the Best Fantasy Audie Award for her work, Nice Dragons Finish Last, as narrated by Vikas Adam.

Bibliography

Fiction

The Crystal Calamity

DFZ

Heartstrikers

Forever Fantasy Online

The Legend of Eli Monpress

Attack on Titan

The Paradox Trilogy

Non-fiction

References

External links

Living people
21st-century American novelists
American science fiction writers
Women science fiction and fantasy writers
American women novelists
21st-century American women writers
Year of birth missing (living people)
21st-century pseudonymous writers
Pseudonymous women writers